Claude Berkeley has been Bishop of Trinidad and Tobago since 2011.

Berkley was educated at Pembroke Anglican School, Tobago; Bishop's High School, Tobago; Valsayn Teachers College, Port of Spain, Codrington College and the University of Birmingham. He was ordained in 1992. His first Priest in charge at St Mary, Tobago. In 2002 he was transferred to All Saints Parish, Trinidad.  In October 2010 he was elected as Coadjutor Bishop in the Diocese of Trinidad and Tobago in 2010.

References

Living people
21st-century Anglican bishops in the Caribbean
Anglican bishops of Trinidad and Tobago
Alumni of Codrington College
People from Tobago
Alumni of the University of Birmingham
Year of birth missing (living people)